Imagine Cup Sri Lanka is the annual competition sponsored by Microsoft Sri Lanka. It is the local round of competition to select teams to represent Sri Lanka at the international Imagine Cup competition sponsored and hosted by Microsoft Corp. Started in 2005, primarily a software design competition, it enlists teams of four within the high school and university levels to submit software solutions addressing a specifically provided theme.

Winners
Past winners;
2005: Team SivuMithun, Faculty of Information Technology, University of Moratuwa
2006: Team Arunalu, Faculty of Information Technology, University of Moratuwa
2007: Team Sara, Faculty of Information Technology, University of Moratuwa
2008: Team Sasrutha, Faculty of Engineering/Faculty of Information Technology, University of Moratuwa
2009: Team Mahee , Sri Lanka Institute of Information Technology.....
2010: Team Collectivists, School of Computing, University of Colombo
2011: Team PeraSoft , Faculty of Engineering, University of Peradeniya
2012: Team Team V360, Faculty of Information Technology, University of Moratuwa
2013: Team Team Firebird , Informatics Institute of Technology.....
2014: 
Innovation - Team Team Firebird, Informatics Institute of Technology
World Citizenship - Team Silver Chasers, Informatics Institute of Technology
2015: 
Games - Dimension X, Informatics Institute of Technology
Innovation - Team DRUTA, Informatics Institute of Technology
World Citizenship - Team Firebird, Informatics Institute of Technology
2016: 
Games - Team Bit Masters, Faculty of Engineering, University of Moratuwa
Innovation - Team Bit Masters, Faculty of Engineering, University of Moratuwa
2017: Team Team Titans, Faculty of Engineering, University of Moratuwa
2018: Team Team AlgoR, Faculty of Computing, Sri Lanka Institute of Information Technology | ESOFT Metro Campus

Participants 

Asia Pacific Institute of Information Technology
ESOFT Metro Campus
Informatics Institute of Technology
Open University of Sri Lanka
Sabaragamuwa University of Sri Lanka
Sri Lanka Institute of Information Technology
University of Colombo
University of Kelaniya
University of Moratuwa
University of Peradeniya
University of Ruhuna

Criticism
The Microsoft Corporation has been criticized for including provisions in the competition's legal documents, stating that by accepting their prizes, winners agree to allow Microsoft to use concepts, techniques, ideas or solutions from the winning applications "for any purpose." Also, the competition has been criticized for being rather Microsoft-centric, with demands such as "the entry must be designed on.NET Framework 2.0 using Microsoft Visual Studio" or "30% of the scoring in this round will be based on use of showcasing the.NET framework".

Microsoft's Rules and Regulations, however, contains a section stating that students' intellectual property will be respected, and that neither Imagine Cup competition nor Microsoft claim ownership of the materials provided by the competitors. It is important to highlight that for the sake of the judgment, internal elements of the solution might be made public to the judges.

See also
 Imagine Cup

References

External links
ImagineCup.lk, Imagine Cup Sri Lanka
ImagineCup.com, Imagine Cup Global Website
Imagine Cup Sri Lanka , Official Facebook Page

Sri Lankan awards